Bwlch (meaning a pass in Welsh) is a small village and an electoral ward in Powys, south Wales.  The settlement is strung out along the A40 road which crosses a low col above the Usk Valley at this point on its route between Brecon and Crickhowell. The village is a part of the administrative community of Llanfihangel Cwmdu with Bwlch and Cathedine.

Geography
The geographical feature from which it derives its name separates the rolling moorland of Cefn Moel and Mynydd Llangorse in the northeast from Buckland Hill to the southwest. Various parts of the village command panoramic views across the Rhiangoll valley to the south-western flanks of the Black Mountains, west to the Brecon Beacons and south to Mynydd Llangynidr and Mynydd Llangatwg. About  to the northwest is the hill of Allt yr Esgair (commonly referred to locally as 'The Allt') whilst  to the southwest is Tor y Foel.

History 

The remains of a defensive enclosure on the slopes of Cefn Moel to the north of the village date from prehistoric times.  There is also a standing stone of unknown origin and purpose set alone in a field within the hairpin of the A40 road. A further standing stone of similarly unknown age is found at Llygad Wy on the slopes dropping down eastwards below the A40. Rising from the Roman auxiliary fort at Pen-y-gaer, east of the village, the Romans constructed a road between Abergavenny and Brecon which passed through the col before crossing the slopes of Allt yr Esgair.  The pass was formerly known as Bwlch'r Allwys and was once guarded by Blaenllynfi Castle, a Norman castle, now a ruin. Three miles to the east are Tretower Castle and Tretower Court, now in the care of Cadw. The Calvinistic Methodist and English Presbyterian chapel of Penuel was first built in 1817, though the modern building dates from 1874.

Amenities 

Most of the business received locally is due to tourists, with holiday accommodation being plentiful. The area is very popular for hillwalking, cycling and horseriding. Though the population of the village itself is small, the community does support a shop with a post office and a cafe. In the late 1990s Bwlch had three public houses but now there is only one bunkhouse, and one backpackers which is also a full-time village pub. There is a small park with four pieces of play equipment. The Beacons Way long-distance footpath passes through Bwlch.

Transport 
Bwlch is situated on the main A40 trunk road and as such is readily accessible even during poor weather, from both Brecon and Abergavenny. The X43 bus service runs between these towns each day. Each bus stop has been fitted with electronic timetables to assist residents and visitors Note the 43 service doesn't run through Bwlch, just the X43. The bus connects with trains from Hereford and Cardiff at Abergavenny, and with Traws Cambria bus service in Brecon.

References

Villages in Powys